Artem Ihorovych Hromov (born 14 January 1990) is a Ukrainian professional footballer who plays as a centre-forward for AEK Larnaca.

Career

Vorksla Poltava
He is a product of the Vorskla Poltava sport school.

He made his debut in playing for Vorskla Poltava in Ukrainian Premier League on match against Illichivets Mariupol on 3 April 2010. On 30 May 2016, Hromov terminated his contract with Vorskla upon mutual agreement, having only 6 months left in his contract.

Dynamo Kyiv
On 31 May 2016, Hromov signed a 3-year contract with the Ukrainian champions Dynamo Kyiv.

Honours

Club
Dynamo Kyiv
Ukrainian Super Cup: 2016

References

External links 
 
 Interview at FC Vorskla Site (Rus)
 

1990 births
Living people
Ukrainian footballers
Ukrainian Premier League players
FC Vorskla Poltava players
People from Stryi
Ukraine international footballers
FC Dynamo Kyiv players
Association football forwards
PFC Krylia Sovetov Samara players
Ukrainian expatriate footballers
Expatriate footballers in Russia
Ukrainian expatriate sportspeople in Russia
Russian Premier League players
FC Zorya Luhansk players
SC Dnipro-1 players
Ukraine youth international footballers
Ukraine under-21 international footballers
Sportspeople from Lviv Oblast